A farm's acreage allotment, under provisions of permanent commodity price support law, is its share, based on its previous production, of the national acreage needed to produce sufficient supplies of a particular crop. Under the 2002 farm bill (P.L. 101-171, Title I), acreage allotments are not applicable to the covered commodities, peanuts, or sugar. Subsequently, allotments and quotas and price support for tobacco were eliminated beginning in 2005 (P.L. 108-357, Title VI).

References

United States Department of Agriculture
Agriculture in the United States